Nigua River may refer to:

 Nigua River (Salinas, Puerto Rico)
 Nigua River (Arroyo, Puerto Rico)